The Learjet 70/75 is a mid-sized business jet airplane manufactured by the Learjet division of Canadian aircraft manufacturer Bombardier Aerospace. With the end of production in 2022 it is the last Learjet model.

Design

These models feature new avionics, winglets, and powerful engines that use less fuel.

The Learjet 40/45 light jet is updated with touchscreen-controlled Garmin G5000 avionics and a modern interior. The combination of aerodynamic improvements, which lowered the design's drag by 2%, and 200 lbs less weight in the nose section resulted in an increased range of 4%.

The canted winglet design was incorporated from the Bombardier Global 7500/8000.

The forward galley facing the entry door is isolated by a pocket door from the seating area with a Lufthansa Technik cabin management, and the aft lavatory has a belted seat.
The  external baggage hold is heated but not pressurized.

Certified to the stricter FAR Part 25, the $13.8 million Learjet 75 competes with the Embraer Phenom 300 and the Citation CJ4, beating them in cabin volume, with  against  respectively, the Phenom having the same cross-section, larger than the  CJ4.
The Mach .81 capable Learjet is faster than the Mach .80 Phenom 300E and the Mach .77 CJ4, and the Phenom can fly  while the CJ4 can fly .

Development
The Learjet 75 received its type certificate from the FAA on 14 November 2013.
Deliveries began shortly thereafter.
This delay in certification caused order cancellations, and Bombardier's overall deliveries fell below expectations. By 2015, the unit cost of the Learjet 70 was US$11.3 million, and US$13.8 million for the Learjet 75. By 2016, production of Learjet 70 has been temporarily discontinued due to lack of orders (with Learjet 75 still being produced).

The 100th Learjet 75 was delivered in June 2017.

By January 2019, Bombardier has delivered 132 Learjet 40/40XRs, 454 45/45XRs, and nearly 130 70/75s, including 24 in 2016 and 14 in 2017.

Bombardier announced the end of the production of Learjet aircraft by the end of 2021. The final Learjet 75 was manufactured in January 2022.
As Bombardier focuses on its larger Challenger and Global jets, it was delivered on 28 March 2022.

Deliveries

Specifications (Learjet 75)

See also
Aircraft of comparable role, configuration and era:
 Beechcraft Premier I
 Citation CJ4
 Embraer Phenom 300
 Grob G180 SPn
 Hawker 400
 Pilatus PC-24
 SyberJet SJ30

References

External links

 
 
 

70 75
Twinjets
T-tail aircraft
Low-wing aircraft